is a Japanese voice actress, singer and gravure idol. Her hometown is Yokohama, Japan. On October 10, 2000, she changed the kanji lettering of her name, though the pronunciation remains the same. She was a member of the J-pop group Aice5 as well. Currently under Avex Management Inc. and LMP Promotion, she was previously represented by Aoni Production and Arts Vision. In 2011, she made her solo musical debut with the single "Kon'ya wa Chupa♡Riko" under Avex.

Filmography

Television animation
2000
Pilot Candidate – Repairer A

2001
Angelic Layer – shop worker (ep 1)
Hikaru no Go – student (ep 7)
InuYasha – Princess (ep 22); Villager (Ep 18)
Kokoro Library – Kaji's Angel (ep 5)
A Little Snow Fairy Sugar – Dove
The Daichis - Earth Defence Family – announcer (ep 6); child B (ep 7); child C (ep 5); girl C (ep 1); Sanae's voice (ep 8); student (ep 12); student C (ep 4); student G (ep 2)

2002
Aquarian Age: Sign for Evolution – girl (ep 5)
Cosplay Complex – Reika Aoshima
Fortune Dogs – Ai-chan
Full Metal Panic! – Ai Tanabe (eps 1 - 2, 4, 8); announcer (ep 14); Shiori Kudou (eps 3, 5, 7, 9)
Mao-chan – Mio Nanba; Officer (Eps 2, 5)
Mirage of Blaze – Wakamono (Ep 6)
Panyo Panyo Di Gi Charat – Girl 3

2003
Kaleido Star – Female Customer
Rumbling Hearts – Mitsuki Hayase – as Tomoko Ishibashi

2004
Akane Maniax – Mitsuki Hayase
Daphne in the Brilliant Blue – Hostess; Mitzue Takahashi
Final Approach – Emiho Mutsu
Futakoi – Ai Momoi; Billy
Gantz – Reporter (ep 4)

2005
Futakoi Alternative – Ai Momoi
Magical Kanan – Calendula
Zoids Genesis – A Kan (eps 16–17)

2006
Otome wa Boku ni Koishiteru – Takako Itsukushima
Fushigiboshi no Futagohime Gyu! – Calore

2007
School Days – Nanami Kanroji

2008
Chaos;Head – Yua Kusunoki
Kaze no Stigma - Catherine McDonald
Yatterman 2008 – Omotchama

2009
Bleach – Haineko

2010
Pocket Monsters: Best Wishes! - Junsar, Satoshi's Gamagaru

2011
Rio: Rainbow Gate! – Rina Tachibana
The Idolm@ster (anime) – Azusa Miura
Hoshizora e Kakaru Hashi – Tsumugi Tōdō
We Without Wings - Under the Innocent Sky – Kinako Mochizuki

2012
Pocket Monsters: Best Wishes! Season 2 - Junsar, Satoshi's Gamagaru

2013
Kill la Kill – Omiko Hakodate (Ep. 2)
Pocket Monsters: Best Wishes! Season 2: Episode N - Junsar, Musashi's Pururill
Pocket Monsters: Best Wishes! Season 2: Decolora Adventure - Junsar, Satoshi's Gamagaru, Musashi's Pururill
Wanna Be the Strongest in the World – Jackal Tojo
Puchimas! Petit Idolmaster – Azusa Miura and Miurasan
BlazBlue: Alter Memory - Litchi Faye Ling

2014
Gundam Reconguista in G – Mashner Hume
Hanayamata – Jennifer N. Fountainstand (Hana's mother)
Momo Kyun Sword – Enki
Terra Formars – Kanako Sanjō

2015
Yatterman Night – Oda-sama
Gintama – Kondo Isao (Female)
Bikini Warriors – Dark Elf

2016
Nobunaga no Shinobi – Kichō
Pretty Guardian Sailor Moon Crystal Season III – Eudial

2017Fairy Tail: Dragon Cry – SwanGaro: Vanishing Line – Waitress ChiakiSeven Mortal Sins – Lust Demon Lord Asmodeus

2019Cautious Hero: The Hero Is Overpowered but Overly Cautious – Chaos Machina

2020The Island of Giant Insects – Misuzu Jinno

2020-22
 Princess Connect! Re:Dive – Christina / Christina Morgan

2021Dragon Goes House-Hunting – ThiefMother of the Goddess' Dormitory – Mineru WachiThe World's Finest Assassin Gets Reincarnated in Another World as an Aristocrat – Esri

Other appearances (merge these with above list)Crayon Shin-chan – female customer; female high school studentHellsing Ultimate – JessicaKnight Hunters Eternity (ep 7)You're Under Arrest – primary school student (ep 19)

Video games
2001Kimi ga Nozomu Eien – Mitsuki Hayase

2002Akane Maniax – Mitsuki Hayase

2003Quiz Magic Academy – AmeliaThe Legend of Zelda: The Wind Waker – Medli (Grunting and exclamations)

2005School Days – Nanami Kanroji (under the name of Mio Fujimura)Swan Song – Yuka Sasaki (under the name of Yuka Sasaki)

2006I/O – IshtarMuv-Luv Alternative – Mitsuki HayaseDawn of Mana - Jinn

2007The Idolmaster – Azusa Miura

2008BlazBlue: Calamity Trigger – Litchi Faye LingChaos;Head – Yua KusunokiThe Idolmaster Live For You! – Azusa MiuraVanguard Princess – Hilda Rize

2009BlazBlue: Continuum Shift – Litchi Faye LingChaos;Head Noah – Yua KusunokiThe Idolmaster SP – Azusa Miura

2010Chaos;Head Love Chu Chu! – Yua KusunokiHyperdimension Neptunia – Magiquone

2011Hyperdimension Neptunia Mk2 – Magic The HardThe Idolmaster 2 – Azusa Miura

2012BlazBlue: Chronophantasma – Litchi Faye LingHyperdimension Neptunia Victory – ArfoireThe Idolmaster Shiny Festa – Azusa Miura

2013Bravely Default – Holly WhyteHyperdimension Neptunia Re;birth1 - Arfoire

2014The Idolmaster One For All – Azusa MiuraHyperdimension Neptunia Re;birth2: Sisters Generation - Magic The HardHyperdevotion Noire: Goddess Black Heart, Hyperdimension Neptunia Re;birth3: V Generation - Arfoire

2015School of Rangarok - LucyMegadimension Neptunia VII - ArfoireBlazBlue: Central Fiction - Litchi Faye Ling

2016Breath of Fire 6 - ElenaGranblue Fantasy - Catherine, SthenoThe Idolmaster Platinum Stars - Azusa Miura

2017Cyberdimension Neptunia: 4 Goddesses Online - Arfoire, Mastermind/MineAzur Lane - Houshou, Azusa MiuraThe Idolmaster Million Live!: Theater Days - Azusa MiuraThe Idolmaster Stella Stage - Azusa Miura

2018SNK Heroines: Tag Team Frenzy - Terry BogardDragalia Lost - VericaPrincess Connect! Re:Dive - Christina Morgan

2020Girls' Frontline - Barrett M82A1, Colt PythonGenshin Impact - XinyanAsh Arms - P-61A Black Widow

2021Magia Record – Isabeau de Bavière, Queen of FranceThe Idolmaster Starlit Season - Azusa Miura
2022

 Counter:Side - Murasame Shion(Lee Jisoo)

Dubbing roles
Live-actionBlue Crush – Penny Chadwick (Mika Boorem)Deadwater Fell – Sandra McKay (Lisa McGrillis)Empire – Rhonda Lyon (Kaitlin Doubleday)Euphoria – Maddy Perez (Alexa Demie)Frank Herbert's Children of Dune – Ghanima Atreides (Jessica Brooks)
Gossip Girl (2007) – Gossip Girl (Kristen Bell), Cyndi Lauper
Gossip Girl (2021) – Gossip Girl (Kristen Bell)Hobbs & Shaw – Madam M (Eiza González)Jurassic World – Vivian (Lauren Lapkus)Mad Max: Fury Road – The Splendid Angharad (Rosie Huntington-Whiteley)Mojin: The Lost Legend – Ding Sitian (Angelababy)Mr. Robot – Darlene Alderson (Carly Chaikin)Princess Hours – Min Hyo-rin (Song Ji-hyo)Smash – Ivy Lynn (Megan Hilty)Snowden – Lindsay Mills (Shailene Woodley)Yo soy Betty, la fea - Aura María Fuentes (Stefania Gómez)

AnimationAngel's Friends (Kabale)The Cuphead Show! (Cala Maria)Rugrats (Angelica Pickles)Superman: The Animated Series (Supergirl)The Spooktacular New Adventures of Casper'' (Kat Harvey) (2003 Cartoon Network version)

References

External links
 

Chiaki Takahashi at Oricon 

1977 births
Living people
Aoni Production voice actors
Arts Vision voice actors
Avex Group talents
Enka singers
Japanese women pop singers
Japanese gravure idols
Japanese video game actresses
Japanese voice actresses
Voice actresses from Yokohama
20th-century Japanese actresses
21st-century Japanese actresses
21st-century Japanese women singers
21st-century Japanese singers